Init Records (often stylized as INIT) is an American independent record label founded in January 2001 in Mankato, Minnesota by Steven Williams. In May 2003 the label relocated to Sioux Falls, South Dakota. Since its foundation the label has been solely owned and run by Williams, as a one-man operation, strongly influenced by DIY ethics of punk subculture and with an "emphasis to release aesthetically pleasing records from hardworking bands." An example of DIY ethics that the label applies in its releases is the use of recycled material, such as paper and plastic whenever and wherever possible.

Artists
The Abandoned Hearts Club
Amenra
Anodyne
The Assailant
 Back When
Battlefields
The Black Soul Choir aka The Falling; McDaniel, Malina, and Pace
The Blinding Light
Building Better Bombs
Buried Inside
Caligari
Calling Gina Clark
Castle
Chibalo
The City Is The Tower
Cougar Den
Dispensing Of False Halos
Enkephalin
Examination Of The...
Eyes Of Verotika
Forstella Ford
The Fortune Healers
Hammerlord
Hewhocorrupts
The Howling Wind
Hennes Siste Høst
Hive Destruction
In the face of war
KEN mode
Kidcrash
Kite Flying Society
Mahkato
Melt-Banana
Meth And Goats
P.O.S
Phoenix Bodies
Raein
Red Knife Lottery
Ricky Fitts
The Setup
Since By Man
Sinking Steps...Rising Eyes
Sleeping In Gethsemane
Souvenir's Young America
The Spirit Of Versailles
Sugartown Cabaret
Swing By Seven
Ten Grand
 Thou
Tora! Tora! Torrance!
Tornavalanche
 Towers
Tyranny Of Shaw
The Vidablue (Renamed as "Ten Grand" - see above)
William Elliott Whitmore
Woman Is the Earth
Wolvhammer

Discography

INIT-78 For Want Of - Smoke CD (2013)
INIT-79 Year of No Light - Vampyr CD (2013)
INIT-78 Roman Ships - Death & The Lover CD (2013)
INIT-77 The Atlas Moth/Wolvhammer - split 7-inch (2013)
INIT-76 Amenra - Live CD (2012)
INIT-75 The Blue Letter - Love Is Not Control CD (2012)
INIT-74 Sinking Steps...Rising Eyes - Two Songs 7-inch (2011)
INIT-73 Battlefields - Agassiz CD (2011)
INIT-72 Kidcrash - Naps 12-inch (2011)
INIT-71 The Fortune Healers - Hey, Providence CD (2011)
INIT-70 Amenra/Hive Destruction - split 10-inch (2011)
INIT-69 William Elliott Whitmore/P.O.S - split 7-inch (2011)
INIT-68 KEN mode - Venerable LP (2011)
INIT-67 Hive Destruction - Secretvm/Veritas CD (2011)
INIT-66 Sugartown Cabaret - Beyond Foams CD (2010)
INIT-65 Thou/The City Is The Tower - Dwell In The Darkness Of Thought And Drink The Poison Of Life (split) LP (2010)
INIT-63 Wolvhammer - Black Marketeers Of World War III CD (2010)
INIT-62 Hammerlord - Wolves At War's End CD (2010)
INIT-60 Souvenir's Young America - The Name Of The Snake CD/LP (2010)
INIT-59 Buried Inside - Chronoclast LP (2010)
INIT-58 Kidcrash - Snacks CD/LP (2009)
INIT-57 Melt-Banana - initial t. 3"CD/7" (2009)
INIT-56 In the face of war - Everything You've Heard Is True CD (2009)
INIT-55 Sleeping In Gethsemane - Burrows CD (2009)
INIT-54 The Blinding Light - Junebug CD (2009)
INIT-53 Towers - Full Circle CD/LP (2009)
INIT-52 Chibalo - Chibalo LP (2010)
INIT-51 Amenra - Mass III-II + Mass IIII 2×CD (2009)
INIT-50 Hammerlord - Hammerlord CD (2008)
INIT-49 Cougar Den - Keepondrifter CD/LP (2008)
INIT-48 The Howling Wind - A Tyrannical Deposit In The Doctrine Of The Soul 7-inch picture disc (2009)
INIT-47 Red Knife Lottery - Hip Bruisers 7-inch (2008)
INIT-46 Battlefields - Entourage Of The Archaic CD/LP (2007)
INIT-45 Kidcrash - Jokes CD (2007)
INIT-44 Phoenix Bodies - Too Much Information CD+DVD (2007)
INIT-43 Hennes Siste Høst - Høst CD (2007)
INIT-42 Building Better Bombs - Freak Out Squares CD/LP (2007)
INIT-41 Hewhocorrupts - The Discographer 2×LP (2007)
INIT-40 Battlefields - Stained With The Blood of An Empire CD (2006)
INIT-39 Back When - In The Presence CD (2006)
INIT-38 Tornavalanche - No Money, No Problems LP (2006)
INIT-36 Castle - Electric Wolves CD (2006)
INIT-35 The Assailant - Nurse EP 7-inch picture disc (2006)
INIT-34 Since By Man - Pictures From The Hotel Apocalypse LP (2005)
INIT-33 Ricky Fitts - Wizard Lisp CD (2005)
INIT-32 The Spirit Of Versailles - Live On WNYU 7-inch (2005)
INIT-31 In the face of war - Summer Demo 2004 7-inch (2005)
INIT-30 Phoenix Bodies/Raein - Split 7-inch (2005)
INIT-29 Kite Flying Society - A Discography CD (2006)
INIT-28 Examination Of The... - The Lady In The Radiator LP (2005)
INIT-26 Back When/The Setup - Split 7-inch (2005)
INIT-24 Back When - Swords Against The Father 7-inch (2004)
INIT-23 In the face of war - Live Forever Or Die Trying CD (2004)
INIT-22 Ricky Fitts/Eyes Of Verotika - Split 7-inch (2005)
INIT-21 Sinking Steps...Rising Eyes - The 2002 EP 7-inch (2004)
INIT-20 Dispensing Of False Halos - Growing Up, Giving In CD (2004)
INIT-19 Phoenix Bodies/Tyranny Of Shaw - Split 7-inch (2004)
INIT-18 Sinking Steps...Rising Eyes - Majestic Blue CD (2004)
INIT-17 The Abandoned Hearts Club - The Initial Confessions Of... CD/7" (2004)
INIT-16 Dispensing Of False Halos/Calling Gina Clark - Split 7-inch (2003)
INIT-15 Anodyne - Salo CD (2003)
INIT-14 The Spirit Of Versailles - Discography 2×CD (2003)
INIT-13 Enkephalin/Phoenix Bodies - Split CD/LP (2003)
INIT-12 Tora! Tora! Torrance!/Swing By Seven - Split 7-inch (2003)
INIT-11 Dispensing Of False Halos - Dispensing Of False Halos 7-inch (2003)
INIT-10 The Black Soul Choir - Cardinal CD (2003)
INIT-09 Dispensing Of False Halos - With Prayers And A Scalpel CD (2003)
INIT-08 Ten Grand/Meth And Goats - Split 7-inch (2004)
INIT-07 The Blinding Light - Glass Bullet 7-inch (2002)
INIT-06 Caligari - Caligari CD (2002)
INIT-05 Forstella Ford - Insincerity Down To An Artform LP (2002)
INIT-04 Mahkato - Fighting The Urge To Start Fires CD/7" (2002)
INIT-03 The Spirit Of Versailles/Caligari - Split 7-inch (2001)
INIT-02 The Vidablue - What I Should Have Said Volume One CD (2001)

See also
 List of record labels

References

External links
 



American independent record labels
Record labels established in 2001
Companies based in South Dakota
Hardcore record labels
Punk record labels
Heavy metal record labels